Didier Lamont (born 13 August 1956) is a Belgian alpine skier. He competed in three events at the 1980 Winter Olympics.

References

1956 births
Living people
Belgian male alpine skiers
Olympic alpine skiers of Belgium
Alpine skiers at the 1980 Winter Olympics
Place of birth missing (living people)